The Lakes of Canada is a rare promotional item self-released by the Innocence Mission in 1999. The title track is taken from the album Birds of My Neighborhood.

Sufjan Stevens covered "The Lakes of Canada" on a May 2007 broadcast of The Take-Away Show. It has also been covered by Stephanie Dosen on her 2007 album A Lily for the Spectre.

Track listing
 The Lakes Of Canada (Album Version) - 4:33 
 Snow (Album Version) - 3:45 
 Moon River - 2:44 
 Prayer Of St. Francis - 2:36 
 Snow (Gus Gus Remix) - 6:44

References

The Innocence Mission albums
1999 EPs